Rich Township High School is a public high school headquartered in the south suburbs of Chicago in Matteson, Illinois. The district enrolls nearly 2,500 students from all or portions of Chicago Heights, Country Club Hills, Olympia Fields, Matteson, Richton Park, Park Forest, Tinley Park, and University Park. The district operates two campuses, a Fine Arts and Communications Campus in Richton Park, and a STEM Campus in Olympia Fields.

History

Rich East High School opened in 1952, becoming the first school in the district and located in Park Forest. The second school, Rich Central High School opened in Olympia Fields in 1959. Rich South High School's campus operated out of the Rich East Campus beginning in late 1972, with a separate Rich South Campus opening in Richton Park in January 1973. In 2019, the district announced that the Rich East campus would be closed going into the 2020–2021 school year.

Future Plans
As of December 2019, the Rich Township district plans include consolidation of the remaining two schools, Rich South and Rich Central. Other plans include renovations of the remaining schools. The renovation plan would involve more than 100 million dollars.

Schools
 Rich Central High School (Olympia Fields)
 Rich East High School (Park Forest)
 Rich South High School (Richton Park)

References

External links

Rich Township High School District 227

School districts in Cook County, Illinois
School districts established in 1952
1952 establishments in Illinois